The 2013–14 Rotor Volgograd season was the 3rd season that the club played in the Russian National Football League.

Squad 

 (captain)

Transfers

Summer

In:

Out:

Winter

In:

Out:

Competitions

Friendlies

Russian National Football League

Results

Table

Russian Cup

Notes:
 Note 1: 20 December 2013 at a meeting of the RFU Control and Disciplinary committee of the decided to deduct FC Khimik Dzerzhinsk defeat with the score 0–3 in the 23 match Russian National Football League Rotor Volgograd – Khimik Dzerzhinsk, which ended 2–0. The reason for this decision was the appearance on the field Ukrainian forward Oleksandr Kasyan, who had no right to do so.
 Note 2: Salyut Belgorod and Alania Vladikavkaz got defeated by a score of 0–3, due to withdraw from the competition due to financial problems.

Squad Statistics in League

Minutes Played

    
    
    
    
    
    • Player in Application    * Player Dismissed from Field

Goal scorers

Discipline

All Tournaments

Appearances and goals

|-
|colspan="14"|Players who completed the season with other clubs:

|}

Top Scorers

Disciplinary Record

Team statistics

Home attendance

Note: bold type font are the highest attendance in round.

General Statistics

References

FC Rotor Volgograd seasons
Rotor